Graham Robertson (born 1957) is a former Scottish international indoor and lawn bowler. He is the second most capped Scottish international of all time. He was inducted into the Scottish Indoor Bowling Hall of Fame in 2016 and is a former national coach.

Bowls career
He won a gold medal in the fours with Angus Blair, Willie Wood and Alex Marshall at the 1992 World Outdoor Bowls Championship in Worthing. Robertson won the men's pairs at the 1998 World Indoor Bowls Championship with bowls partner Richard Corsie.

He has represented Scotland three times at the Commonwealth Games from 1986-1994.

He won the 1987 Scottish National Bowls Championships and subsequently won the singles at the British Isles Bowls Championships in 1988.

In 1990 and 1993, he won the Hong Kong International Bowls Classic singles title, in addition to winning the pairs titles in 1990.

Personal life
He is a Managing Director of a Sports Surfaces company called Greengauge.

References

Living people
Scottish male bowls players
Bowls World Champions
Place of birth missing (living people)
1957 births
Indoor Bowls World Champions
Bowls players at the 1986 Commonwealth Games
Bowls players at the 1990 Commonwealth Games
Bowls players at the 1994 Commonwealth Games
Commonwealth Games competitors for Scotland